106.3 DABIG C Radio (DXDI 106.3 MHz) is an FM station owned and operated by Prime Broadcasting Network. It serves as the flagship station of DABIG C Radio network, formerly known as Prime FM. Its studios and transmitter are located at Estrada Subd., Brgy. Zone 2, Digos.

References

External links
DABIG C Radio FB Page

Radio stations in Davao del Sur
Radio stations established in 2012